This is a list of Ambassadors and High Commissioners to and from New Zealand as of 2020.

International organisations

See also
List of New Zealand diplomatic posts
Foreign relations of New Zealand

References

 
 
New Zealand
New Zealand